Pousada Marina Infante is a 4-star hotel located at Cotai, Macau, China. Its services include a business center, safe deposit boxes, laundry services and more. 

It has a casino called Casino Marina but it is currently closed for renovations.

See also 
 Gambling in Macau
List of properties on the Cotai Strip 
 List of Macau casinos

References

External links

Casinos completed in 1999
Casinos in Macau
Hotels in Macau
1999 establishments in Macau
Hotel buildings completed in 1999